Atomic lattice may refer to:
 In mineralogy, atomic lattice refers to the arrangement of atoms into a crystal structure.
 In order theory, a lattice is called an atomic lattice if the underlying partial order is atomic.
In chemistry, atomic lattice refers to the arrangement of atoms in an atomic crystalline solid.